The list of shipwrecks in 1934 includes ships sunk, foundered, grounded, or otherwise lost during 1934.

January

1 January

3 January

4 January

5 January

6 January

7 January

12 January

14 January

16 January

17 January

18 January

19 January

22 January

23 January

24 January

25 January

29 January

February

1 February

2 February

6 February

7 February

8 February

10 February

12 February

13 February

15 February

16 February

17 February

18 February

19 February

20 February

22 February

23 February

26 February

27 February

28 February

March

1 March

5 March

6 March

7 March

8 March

9 March

12 March

13 March

14 March

15 March

17 March

20 March

21 March

22 March

25 March

26 March

27 March

28 March

29 March

April

2 April

4 April

7 April

8 April

9 April

12 April

13 April

14 April

17 April

22 April

23 April

25 April

May

3 May

5 May

7 May

8 May

10 May

11 May

13 May

15 May

17 May

18 May

20 May

22 May

26 May

27 May

28 May

29 May

June

1 June

5 June

8 June

9 June

10 June

11 June

15 June

16 June

17 June

19 June

20 June

28 June

29 June

July

5 July

6 July

9 July

12 July

13 July

15 July

17 July

20 July

23 July

24 July

25 July

26 July

28 July

31 July

August

1 August

8 August

9 August

13 August

15 August

20 August

22 August

25 August

26 August

27 August

28 August

September

2 September

3 September

4 September

7 September

8 September

9 September

10 September

12 September

16 September

20 September

21 September

24 September

25 September

27 September

29 September

October

2 October

4 October

4–5 October (overnight)

5 October

6 October

8 October

9 October

11 October

13 October

15 October

16 October

18 October

19 October

21 October

23 October

27 October

28 October

29 October

30 October

31 October

November

1 November

2 November

5 November

7 November

8 November

9 November

14 November

17 November

18 November

20 November

21 November

22 November

23 November

24 November

27 November

29 November

30 November

Unknown date

December

1 December

2 December

3 December

4 December

5 December

8 December

9 December

10 December

11 December

13 December

14 December

17 December

18 December

19 December

24 December

31 December

Unknown date

Unknown date

References

1934
 
Ship